Rineloricaria stewarti, sometimes known as Stewart's whiptail catfish, is a species of catfish in the family Loricariidae. It is native to South America, where it occurs in the coastal rivers of the Guianas, being known from French Guiana, Guyana, and Suriname. It is typically seen in moderately sunlit forest creeks with a depth of 10 to 60 cm (3.9 to 23.6 inches), clear, fast-moving water, and a substrate composed of rocks and sand. It is known to occur alongside the species Corydoras guianensis and Moenkhausia oligolepis, as well as members of the genus Phenacogaster. 

Mature male individuals of Rineloricaria stewarti are known to develop odontodes on both sides of the head and towards the back of the interorbitals. The species reaches 10 cm (3.9 inches) in standard length and is believed to be a facultative air-breather.

References 

Fish of French Guiana
Fish of Guyana
Fish of Suriname
Fish described in 1909
Taxa named by Carl H. Eigenmann
Loricariidae